Cassandra Ford (born 17 February 1981) is a visual artist and co-founder/original lead singer of The Vincent Black Shadow.

Musical career 

The Vincent Black Shadow signed with Bodog Music who released their first album on 11 July 2006, as well as their second album, which was released 15 September 2008.

Voice work 

Cassandra Ford voiced the character Spinlyn in the series Legends of Chima. 

Ford performs voice work and singing vocals under the alias CAXX for several web-based animations found on Newgrounds and YouTube - most notably as the hentai mascot, Zone-Tan.

Ford is represented by Play Management, a talent agency based out of Vancouver, British Columbia.

Discography

References

External links 
The Vincent Black Shadow Website

YouTube
Twitter

Singers from Manila
Canadian women rock singers
Filipino emigrants to Canada
1981 births
Living people
21st-century Canadian women singers